Ma'alefa'ak (also known as Malefic and Malefic Jones) is a supervillain appearing in American comic books published by DC Comics, usually depicted as the archenemy of his twin brother, the superhero Martian Manhunter. Created by writer John Ostrander and artist Tom Mandrake, the character first appeared in Martian Manhunter (vol. 2) #0 (October 1998).

The character appears in the 2012 animated film Justice League: Doom, in which he is voiced by Carl Lumbly. The character appears in the fifth season of Supergirl after appearing in the season finale of the fourth season voiced and portrayed by Phil LaMarr.

Publication history
The character first appears in a flashback sequence in Martian Manhunter (vol. 2) #0 (October 1998) and in a storyline in the same title in issues #3–6 (February–May 1999) by writer John Ostrander and artist Tom Mandrake.

Fictional character biography
Ma'alefa'ak, a native of the planet Mars, is the twin brother and archenemy of J'onn J'onnz, a.k.a. the Martian Manhunter. Led to believe he was the only member of the Martian race born without telepathy and a weakness to fire, Ma'alefa'ak was actually stripped of this ability and his memory erased when he mind-raped J'onn's wife, M'yri'ah. Feeling ostracized because of his perceived genetic differences, Ma'alefa'ak engineered a deadly trap for the remainder of his race called "H’ronmeer’s Curse". When the Martians attempted to use their telepathic abilities to communicate with each other or the Great Mind, they would fall victim to a plague of fire and literally burn to death.

With his race destroyed and the Martian Manhunter teleported to Earth against his will—J'onn having escaped infection by the virus by sealing his mind from the rest of his people—Ma'alefa'ak lived alone on Mars for centuries. Eventually learning that J'onn still lived, Ma'alefa'ak followed him to Earth. Posing as J'onn, Ma'alefa'ak battled several members of the Justice League and tortured Jemm before confronting J'onn directly, seeking to destroy J'onn's reputation before killing him. However, J'onn was able to defeat Ma'alefa'ak by erasing the telepathic block, thereby returning Ma'alefa'ak's telepathic abilities and phobia of fire. Trapped on the vessel in close proximity to the sun, and lacking experience with the telepathic barriers that other Martians had been able to develop over the years to protect them in similar cases, a terrified Ma'alefa'ak could only watch as he was consumed by the fiery heat.

In The New 52 reboot of DC's continuity, Ma'alefa'ak was reintroduced in a 2015 storyline in which the Earth-born Martian survivors of the mass death of the Martian race build a weapon to infiltrate and help enslave the Earth.

Powers and abilities
Ma'alefa'ak possesses abilities similar to the Martian Manhunter and all other Green Martians. The character has superhuman levels of strength, stamina speed and durability. Other base abilities include "Martian vision" (projecting energy beams from his eyes). Complete control of his molecular structure also allows Ma'alefa'ak to shapeshift, regenerate, and utilize invisibility and intangibility. Ma'alefa'ak also possesses telekinesis, and originally possessed telepathy, although this ability was removed by the Council of Mars.

Although Martians can be weakened by fire and suffer from pyrophobia ("H’ronmeer's Curse"), Ma'alefa'ak did not share this weakness due to the removal of his telepathic abilities. When the Martian Manhunter removed the telepathic block instilled by the Council, Ma'alefa'ak regained his telepathic abilities but was also once again susceptible to fire, his vulnerability stronger than the standard Green Martian due to his lack of experience at resisting the flames.

In other media

Television
 A variation of Ma'alefa'ak appears in Young Justice, voiced by Benjamin Diskin. This version is a White Martian named M'comm M'orzz, the younger brother of M'gann, and the son of a White Martian father and Green Martian mother who feels that White Martians are oppressed by the Green and Red Martians, describing the former as "a superstitious, cowardly lot" and taking his codename from the Green Martian equivalent of the Bogeyman to strike terror in them. In the Young Justice: Outsiders episode "Away Mission", Ma'alefa'ak impersonates Orion and attacks the native Bug hives on New Genesis in an attempt to make them wage war with the New Gods in exchange for him gaining support for his White Martian revolution. While M'gann reveals his identity and defeats him in psychic combat, he escapes, swearing revenge on Forager for interfering with his plans. In Young Justice: Phantoms, Ma'alefa'ak has become publicly known as a terrorist and gained secret support from Darkseid's forces. He plants a Kryptonite-laced gene bomb on Mars, intending to wipe out the Green and Red Martians, but Superboy seemingly sacrifices himself to foil the plot. Blaming him for Superboy's death, M'gann confronts Ma'alefa'ak, but he confesses to having no knowledge of the Kryptonite before escaping to Apokolips. He is later tasked with helping Lor-Zod, who planted the Kryptonite on the gene bomb, accomplish his mission to free the latter's family from the Phantom Zone and comes to learn he was responsible for seemingly assassinating Superboy. After taking the Legion of Super-Heroes and Kid Flash hostage, the pair discover Superboy is still alive and imprisoned in the Phantom Zone. By the end of the season, Ma'alefa'ak is defeated and banished to the Zone, though he is later released by the Light, returned to Darkseid, and receives a planet where he can establish a White Martian community.
 Malefic J'onzz appears in Supergirl, voiced by Phil LaMarr while Marcello Guedes and Domonique Robinson portray him as a boy and teenager respectively. During a civil war between the Green and White Martians, this version of Malefic betrayed the former to help the latter. In response, the Martian Council imprisoned him in the Phantom Zone and erased all memory of him from the Martians' collective consciousness. In the season four finale "The Quest for Peace", the Monitor frees Malefic from the Phantom Zone and sets him loose on Earth-38 to seek vengeance on his brother J'onn J'onzz. Throughout season five, Malefic battles Supergirl and J'onn several times until he is captured by Lena Luthor, who seeks to use his psionic powers for her own ends, before he is rescued by and reconciles with J'onn. After helping the Department of Extranormal Operations foil Luthor's plans, Malefic returns to Mars.

Film
Ma'alefa'ak appears in Justice League: Doom, voiced by Carl Lumbly. He joins Vandal Savage's Legion of Doom to kill the Justice League. As part of Savage's plan, Ma'alefa'ak exposes Martian Manhunter to magnesium carbonate and attempts to incinerate him with it, but Batman and Wonder Woman save Martian Manhunter via aluminum oxide. The Justice League later storm the Legion's headquarters, with Martian Manhunter fighting Ma'alefa'ak until the latter is exposed to a missile's flames and the former leaves to fight the other Legionnaires.

Miscellaneous
A White Martian variation of Ma'alefa'ak appears in Batman: The Brave and the Bold #18 (August 2010).

References

External links
 Ma'alefa'ak at DC Comics Wiki
 Ma'alefa'ak at Comic Vine
 The Vile Menagerie: MALEFIC at The Idol-Head of Diabolu

DC Comics extraterrestrial supervillains
DC Comics supervillains
DC Comics aliens 
DC Comics characters who are shapeshifters
DC Comics characters who can move at superhuman speeds
DC Comics characters with accelerated healing
DC Comics characters with superhuman senses
DC Comics characters with superhuman strength
DC Comics characters who have mental powers 
DC Comics telepaths 
DC Comics telekinetics
Fictional characters who can turn intangible
Fictional characters who can turn invisible
Fictional characters with X-ray vision
Fictional characters who can stretch themselves
Fictional characters with density control abilities
Fictional characters with energy-manipulation abilities
Fictional characters with fire or heat abilities 
Fictional characters with slowed ageing
Fictional Martians
Twin characters in comics
Characters created by John Ostrander
Comics characters introduced in 1998